Two vessels of the United States Navy have been named Andrew Doria, which is the anglicized name of Italian admiral Andrea Doria.

Andrew Doria, a Continental Navy brig built in 1775
, a former Italian tanker built in 1908

See also

Sources

United States Navy ship names